Zaire (now called the Democratic Republic of the Congo) competed at the 1992 Summer Olympics in Barcelona, Spain. Seventeen competitors, fifteen men and two women, took part in fourteen events in four sports.

Competitors
The following is the list of number of competitors in the Games.

Athletics

Men's 5.000 metres
Mwenze Kalombo
 Heat — did not start (→ did not advance, 62nd place)

Men's 4 × 400 m Relay
Ilunga Kafila, Luasa Batungile, Kaleka Mutoke, and Shintu Kibambe
 Heat — 3:21.91 (→ did not advance, 21st place)

Men's Marathon
 Mwenze Kalombo — 2:23.47 (→ 50th place)

Women's Marathon
 Bakombo Kungu — 3:29.10 (→ 37th place)

Boxing

Men's Middleweight (– 75 kg)
Mohamed Siluvangi
 First Round — Bye
 Second Round — Lost to Chris Johnson (CAN), RSCH-3 (02:39)

Cycling

Three cyclists represented Zaire in 1992.

Men's road race
 Mobange Amisi
 Selenge Kimoto
 Ndjibu N'Golomingi

Judo

Men's extra-lightweight (–60 kg)
Bosolo Mobando

Men's half-lightweight (–65 kg)
Dikubenga Mavatiku

Men's lightweight (–71 kg)
Lusambu Mafuta

Men's half-middleweight (–78 kg)
Musuyu Kutama

Men's middleweight (–86 kg)
Ilualoma Isako

Men's half-heavyweight (–95 kg)
Mamute Mbonga

References

External links
 Official Olympic Reports
 

Nations at the 1992 Summer Olympics
1992